Pope Dioscorus may refer to:

 Pope Dioscorus I of Alexandria, ruled in 444–454
 Pope Dioscorus II of Alexandria, ruled in 516–517